Zhu Zhifan (died 1510) was a member of the Ming dynasty's imperial family. He held the title Prince of Anhua from 1492 until 1510; his major power was in central Shaanxi.

Uprising

The Prince of Anhua had long thought himself a suitable candidate to become the Ming Emperor. He shared his views with several military commanders, officials, local scholars and shamans, and also recruited a handful of soldiers. 

In 1510, the court official Liu Jin was dispatched to Shaanxi in order to implement the new rate of taxation on military areas. He punished corrupt tax officials; all of them were the Prince of Anhua's men. The Prince of Anhua seized this opportunity and stirred up his supporters to rebel.

On 12 May 1510, all the high officials of the region were invited to a banquet held at the prince's residence. During the banquet, his soldiers rushed in and slaughtered several officers, officials, and eunuchs. Soldiers also were sent to kill officials who had refused to attend the banquet. Then their offices were wrecked and burned.

Anhua proclaimed that he rebelled to get rid of Liu Jin and asked for support from the regional commanders, hoping for reinforcement. But the commanders were too afraid of Liu Jin's power, and refused to respond. Liu Jin failed to put down the rebellion and quickly fled.

Soon this news reached the court. The Zhengde Emperor send the imperial army in order to punish the prince. General Yang Yiqing was in charge as supreme commander, and the eunuch Zhang Yong was appointed as inspector of the army. However, before they reached Shaanxi, the uprising was already put down. On 30 May 1510, a cavalry commander who feigned to join the uprising, had already seized the Prince of Anhua.

Death
After the seizure of Anhua, Zhang Yong escorted the prince to Beijing. Anhua was soon executed in the same year.

See also
Prince of Ning

References
The Cambridge History of China, Vol. 7: The Ming Dynasty, 1368–1644, Part I, "The Prince of Anhua Uprising" by Frederick W. Mote and Denis Twitchett.

15th-century births
1510 deaths
Ming dynasty imperial princes
Ming dynasty rebels
Executed Ming dynasty people
16th-century executions by China
People from Qingyang
Executed people from Gansu
Forced suicides of Chinese people
Rebellious princes